AP-5 complex subunit mu (AP5M1) is a protein that in humans is encoded by the AP5M1 gene.

Function 

The protein encoded by this gene is the medium-sized subunit of the AP5 adaptor complex. Variants in this gene have not been implicated in any disease but damaging variants in AP5Z1, the gene encoding one of the large subunits in this complex, are associated with SPG48, a type of hereditary spastic paraplegia. In addition, damaging variants in the genes encoding two proteins that stably associate with the AP-5 adaptor complex are also associated with forms of hereditary spastic paraplegia - SPG11 with the disease of the same name and ZFYVE26 with SPG15 (disease).

References